Hokus Pick (or Hokus Pick ) was a Christian rock band that was together from 1989 to 1999. The four members of Hokus Pick met in Vancouver, British Columbia. Hokus Pick was well known for their quirky sense of humour, using sarcasm, satire, and general silliness to convey a deeper message.

Hokus Pick toured extensively in Canada and the United States. The band opened for Steve Taylor's Squinternational tour in 1994 and played in Costa Rica in May 1998. The group released their final album in 1999, opting to spend more time with their families after more than a decade of recording and touring together. They have remained active in music ministry and the industry.

The Encyclopedia of Contemporary Christian Music cites their song "I'm So Happy" as possibly the worst CCM song of all time. The song is a satire of simplistic lyrics often heard on Christian radio. Ironically, it received heavy rotation on Christian stations.

In October 2007 Hokus Pick received a Lifetime Achievement Award from the Canadian Gospel Music Association at the 29th Annual Covenant Awards in Calgary, Alberta.  Hokus Pick then performed live and hosted the 30th Annual Covenant Awards on October 24, 2008.

Rumours abounded that Hokus Pick was planning a comeback into music, after having been spotted in a secluded warehouse jamming together. Filmmaking company Transposition Films, composed of legendary members itself, avoided questions regarding their involvement in filming a documentary about the process.

Members
 Russ Smith – lead vocals, guitar
 Matt Pierrot – guitar, vocals
 Dave Strilchuk – bass guitar, vocals
 Rick Colhoun – drums, vocals

Discography
 Hokus Pick  (independent) (1988)
 Hey Man! (independent) (1989)
 Pick It Up (1992, review)
 The Independents (1993)
 Brothers from Different Mothers (1994, review)
 Brothers From Different Mothers (video) (1994)
 Bookaboom (1995)
 The B-Sides (1996)
 Snappy (1997, reviews)
 Greatest Picks (1998)
 Super Duper (1999, reviews)

Songs in other projects
 "We Are the People" on Believe It, Various Artists (Revival, 1999)
 GMA Canada presents 30th Anniversary Collection, "I'm So Happy" (CMC, 2008)

Further reading

References

External links
 Hokus Pick discography at Jesus Freak Hideout
 

Musical groups established in 1988
Musical groups from Vancouver
Canadian Christian rock groups
1988 establishments in British Columbia